Guzmania calothyrsus is a plant species in the genus Guzmania. This species is native to Bolivia, Colombia, Peru and Guyana.

References

calothyrsus
Flora of South America
Plants described in 1896